Berovka (Macedonian: Беровка; English: Dance from Berovo) is a traditional Macedonian Oro, folk dance, from the town of Berovo in the region of Maleševo.

It is a women's dance with fast movements on a half feet with many jumps. The dancers are holding hands and begin their dance in a position of a half circle.

Further reading
Dimovski, Mihailo. (1977:73-5). Macedonian folk dances (Original in Macedonian: Македонски народни ора). Skopje: Naša kniga & Institut za folklor

See also
Music of North Macedonia

External links
The music of Berovka by Ivan Terziev on YouTube
The notes of Berovka
Link to the music sample of Berovka played by Pece Atanasovski, the famous Macedonian bagpiper

Macedonian dances